The Platform is a German anarcho-communist organization founded in January 2019, which refers to the organizational form of platformism.

Aims and objectives
The aim of the platform is, according to its own account, "to overcome all forms of oppression and domination and to build a society without domination, class and statehood on the basis of communist anarchism."

The platform's ideological orientation is communist anarchism, based on the ideas of Peter Kropotkin, Mikhail Bakunin, Errico Malatesta, Nestor Makhno and Erich Mühsam, among others.

Organizationally, the platform refers to the principle of platformism and makes use of the specific concept of "social inclusion". The principles of theoretical and tactical unity, commitment and collective activity is intended to improve the structuring of the anarchist organization and thereby make the anarchist movement more capable of action.

The reason for the founding of the platform was, according to the organization itself, a "general lack of strategy, extensive public invisibility, as well as a bad external impact" of the anarchist movement in German-speaking countries.

The platform is convinced that "the social revolution can only be achieved if (almost) all anarchist currents, approaches and tactics are present". This includes "syndicalist tactics and goals, as well as insurrectionary acts of resistance, and lived anarchist structures in the here and now."

Activities
The platform relies on the concept of organizational dualism, which means that it is active within the anarchist movement on the one hand, but also gets involved in social movements outside the anarchist and left-wing radical spectrum.

According to the organization's own statements, the main focus of the work are rent and industrial disputes, as well as participation in the climate, environmental and feminist movements.

The platform does not claim to be a mass organization, but sees this task in the social movements; the platform rejects the concept of a political vanguard.

At the local level, the platform is networked with groups from the Federation of German-speaking Anarchists and the Free Workers' Union.

Structure
The platform consists of several local groups and a supraregional group, which are networked with each other and are federally linked. There is also a group of supporters consisting of sympathizers. It is networked with anarchist organizations worldwide and supports in the sense of an "anti-national, limitless solidarity", among other things, anarchist opposition activists in Belarus.

Observation by the Office for the Protection of the Constitution
The constitutional protection authorities classify the platform as left-wing extremists. So the platform is, among other things. mentioned in the reports for the protection of the constitution of the states of Baden-Württemberg, Saxony-Anhalt, Brandenburg and Bavaria.

References

External links 
 Website: die plattform – anarchakommunistische Organisation
 Youtube: die plattform – anarchakommunistische Organisation

2019 establishments in Germany
Anarchist organisations in Germany
Communist organisations in Germany
Political organisations based in Germany